Yasser Ahmed Salem Al-Awadi (1 March 1978 – 15 November 2021) was a Yemeni politician. A member of the General People's Congress, he served in the House of Representatives from 2003 until his death in 2021.

References

1978 births
2021 deaths
Yemeni politicians
Members of the House of Representatives (Yemen)
General People's Congress (Yemen) politicians
People from Al Bayda Governorate